Countess Granville is a title that has been held by a number of women, either in their own right or as wife of Earl Granville. They include:

Countess in her own right
Grace Carteret, 1st Countess Granville (c.1667–1744)

Countesses through marriage
Harriet Leveson-Gower, Countess Granville (1785-1862)
Rose Leveson-Gower, Countess Granville (1890-1967)